is a Japanese singer, actor, voice actor and radio host. He is also a member and the drummer of Japanese male idol group Kanjani Eight, which is under the management of Johnny & Associates. His image color in the group is green.

Biography
He respects Go Morita from V6, he is the reason that Okura joined Johnny & Associates.

Tadayoshi Okura had been chosen to be a part of V West (a Johnny's Jr. group) before its formation. His interest being in dancing and thinking that an instrument would tie him down, he declined the position, a move he would later regret. He was a member of Johnny's unit MAO for a while. Later, he got a second chance when Johnny Kitagawa wanted an eighth member to form Kanjani8 who could also be the drummer for V West. Yasuda Shota told Johnny that since Okura could dance well, he'll be able to play drums. Not knowing how to drum but eager to try, Okura began intensive lessons a month prior to the formation of Kanjani Eight. He had his first solo concert in 2008. He is also active in TV dramas, playing a few major roles such as Yasuko to Kenji, Hissatsu Shigotonin, ROMES and GM Odore Doctor. In 2010, he appeared in movie for first time' playing the role of sword man Tsuruoka in Ooku. Besides, he is a hardcore fan of Mr.Children.

Filmography

Drama
2000: Kowaii Nichiyoubi 2000
2006: Cinderella ni Naritai! as Ken Narumizaka/Bon Kuramochi (lead role)
2006: Gekidan Engimono: Intelligence as Hajime (lead role)
2007: Hissatsu Shigotonin 2007 as Genta
2007: Utahime as Jinguji-kun (James)
2008: Yasuko to Kenji as Jun Tsubaki
2009: Hissatsu Shigotonin 2009 as Genta
2009: Romes as Yūya Narushima (lead role)
2010: Gm: Odore Doctor as Kensuke Motoki
2011: Umareru as Hayashida Taichi
2012: Mikeneko Holmes no Suiri as Ishizu Ryohei
2012: papadol! as himself
2013: Otenki Onee-san as Detective Gota Aoki (lead role)
2014: Dr.Dmat: Gareki no Shita no Hippocrates as Hibiki Yakumo (lead role)
2014: Hana-chan no Misoshiru as Shingo Yasutake (lead role)
2015: Do S Deka as Shūsuke Daikanyama
2018: The Count of Monte Cristo as Yukio Nanjo

Film
2010: Ōoku as Tsuruoka
2012: Eight Ranger as Ookawa Ryousuke
2013: Crying 100 Times: Every Raindrop Falls as Fuji Shuichi
2014: Eight Ranger 2 as Ookawa Ryousuke
2014: Clover as Tsuge Susumu
2016: Shippu Rondo as Shōhei Nezu
2020: The Cornered Mouse Dreams of Cheese

Music film
2010: 8Uppers as Johnny

References

External links

Japanese male actors
Japanese male pop singers
Japanese idols
Living people
Kanjani Eight members
1985 births
People from Higashiōsaka
Musicians from Osaka Prefecture